A blister agent (or vesicant), is a chemical compound that causes severe skin, eye and mucosal pain and irritation. They are named for their ability to cause severe chemical burns, resulting in painful water blisters on the bodies of those affected. Although the term is often used in connection with large-scale burns caused by chemical spills or chemical warfare agents, some naturally occurring substances such as cantharidin are also blister-producing agents (vesicants). Furanocoumarin, another naturally occurring substance, causes vesicant-like effects indirectly, for example, by increasing skin photosensitivity greatly. Vesicants have medical uses including wart removal but can be dangerous if even small amounts are ingested.

Blister agents used in warfare
Most blister agents fall into one of three groups:
 Sulfur mustards – A family of sulfur-based agents, including mustard gas.
 Nitrogen mustards – A family of agents similar to the sulfur mustards, but based on nitrogen instead of sulfur.
 Lewisite – An early blister agent that was developed, but not used, during World War I. It was effectively rendered obsolete with the development of British anti-Lewisite in the 1940s.

Occasionally, phosgene oxime is included among the blister agents, although it is more properly termed a nettle agent (urticant).

Effects 
Exposure to a weaponized blister agent can cause a number of life-threatening symptoms, including:
 Severe skin, eye and mucosal pain and irritation
 Skin erythema with large fluid blisters that heal slowly and may become infected
 Tearing, conjunctivitis, corneal damage
 Mild respiratory distress to marked airway damage

All blister agents currently known are denser than air, and are readily absorbed through the eyes, lungs, and skin. Effects of the two mustard agents are typically delayed: exposure to vapors becomes evident in 4 to 6 hours, and skin exposure in 2 to 48 hours. The effects of Lewisite are immediate.

References

External links 
 Medterms.com
 Medical Aspects of Biological and Chemical Warfare, Chapter 7: Vesicants